Please add names of notable painters with a Wikipedia page, in precise English alphabetical order, using U.S. spelling conventions. Country and regional names refer to where painters worked for long periods, not to personal allegiances.

Mirko Rački (1879–1982), Austro-Hungarian (Croatian)/Yugoslav painter
Anton Räderscheidt (1892–1970), German painter
Ronald Rae (born 1946), Scottish sculptor
Henry Raeburn (1756–1823), Scottish portrait painter
Fiona Rae (born 1963), English painter
Carl Rahl (1812–1865), Austrian painter
Francesco Raibolini (1453–1518), Italian painter, goldsmith and medalist
Victor Noble Rainbird (1888–1936), English painter, stained-glass artist and illustrator
Edi Rama (born 1964), Albanian painter, writer and politician
Allan Ramsay (1713–1784), Scottish portrait painter
Carlo Randanini (d. 1884), Italian painter
Ivan Ranger (1700–1753), Austrian (Tyrolean) painter
Arabella Rankin (1871 – c. 1935), Scottish painter and woodcut artist
Raphael (1483–1520), Italian painter and architect
Joseph Raphael (1869–1950), American painter
Dorning Rasbotham (1730–1791), English artist and writer
Slava Raškaj (1877–1906), Austro-Hungarian (Croatian) painter
Robert Rauschenberg (1925–2008), American painter and graphic artist
Dirck de Quade van Ravesteyn (1565–1620), Dutch painter
Hubert van Ravesteyn (1638–1691), Dutch painter
Jan Antonisz van Ravesteyn (1572–1657), Dutch court painter
Rachel Reckitt (1908–1995), English wood engraver, sculptor and designer
Edward Willis Redfield (1869–1965), American landscape painter
Tommaso Redi (1665–1726), Italian painter
Odilon Redon (1840–1916), French painter, print-maker and draftsman
Pierre-Joseph Redouté (1759–1840), Belgian painter and botanist
Anne Redpath (1895–1965), Scottish painter
Paula Rego (born 1935), Portuguese/English visual artist
István Regős (born 1954), Hungarian painter and artist
Don Reichert (born 1932), Canadian artist and photographer
Flora Macdonald Reid (1861–1938), Scottish/English painter
George Reid (1841–1913), Scottish painter
John Robertson Reid (1851–1926), Scottish/English painter 
Robert Reid (1862–1929), American painter and stained-glass artist
Wenzel Lorenz Reiner (1688–1743), Bohemian painter
Rembrandt (1606–1669), Dutch draftsman, painter and print-maker
Frederic Remington (1861–1909), American painter, sculptor and writer
Ren Bonian (任頤, 1840–1896), Chinese painter
Ren Renfa (任仁發, 1254–1327), Chinese artist and government official
Ren Xiong (任熊, 1823–1857), Chinese painter
Ren Xun (任薰, 1835–1893), Chinese painter
Guido Reni (1575–1642), Italian painter
Pierre-Auguste Renoir (1841–1919), French painter
Pierre Roland Renoir (born 1958), Canadian painter
Tibor Rényi (born 1973), Hungarian painter
Ilya Yefimovich Repin (1844–1930), Russian/Soviet painter
Marcos Restrepo (born 1961), Ecuadorian painter
Paul Resika (born 1928), American painter
István Réti (1872–1945), Hungarian painter, professor and art historian
Pablo Rey (born 1968), Spanish painter
Maurice Reymond (1862–1936), Swiss sculptor, painter and engraver
Joshua Reynolds (1723–1792), English portrait painter
J. Massey Rhind (1860–1936), Scottish/American sculptor
John Rhind (1828–1892), Scottish sculptor
John Stevenson Rhind (1859–1937), Scottish sculptor
William Birnie Rhind (1853–1933), Scottish sculptor
Théodule Ribot (1823–1891), French painter and print-maker
Sebastiano Ricci (1659–1734), Italian painter
Suzy Rice (living), American painter, screenwriter and fiction author
Ceri Richards (1903–1971), Welsh painter and print-maker
Jesse Richards (born 1975), American painter, film-maker and photographer
William Trost Richards (1833–1905), American landscape artist
Mary Curtis Richardson (1848–1931), American painter
Willy Bo Richardson (born 1974), American painter
Robert Richenburg (1917–2006), American painter
William Blake Richmond (1842–1921), English painter, sculptor and stained-glass designer
Gerhard Richter (born 1932), German visual artist
Charles Ricketts (1866–1931), Swiss-born English painter, illustrator and typographer
Hyacinthe Rigaud (1659–1743), French painter
Anne Rigney (born 1957), Irish visual artist and sculptor
Bridget Riley (born 1931), English op art painter
Penny Rimbaud (born 1943), English painter, poet and musician
L. A. Ring (1854–1933), Danish painter
Pieter de Ring (1615–1660), Dutch painter
Jean-Paul Riopelle (1923–2002), Canadian painter and sculptor
József Rippl-Rónai (1861–1927), Hungarian painter
Friedrich Ritter von Friedländer-Malheim (1825–1901), Austro-Hungarian (Bohemian) painter
Rafael Ritz (1829–1894), Swiss painter
Arturo Rivera (born 1945), Mexican painter
Diego Rivera (1886–1957), Mexican painter
Manuel Rivera (1927–1995), Spanish painter
Larry Rivers (1923–2002), American artist, musician and film-maker
Hubert Robert (1733–1808), French painter
David Roberts (1796–1864), Scottish painter and lithographer
Tom Roberts (1856–1931), Australian artist
Alexander Robertson (1772–1841), Scottish/American miniaturist and engraver
Andrew Robertson (1777–1845), Scottish miniaturist
Archibald Robertson (1765–1835), Scottish/American painter and watercolorist
Theodore Robinson (1852–1896), American painter
Norman Rockwell (1894–1978), American painter and illustrator
Henryk Rodakowski (1823–1894), Polish painter
Alexander Rodchenko (1891–1956), Russian artist, sculptor and photographer
Holger Roed (1846–1874), Danish painter
Jørgen Roed (1808–1888), Danish painter
Nicholas Roerich (1874–1947), Russian painter and philosopher
Svetoslav Roerich (1904–1993), Russian/Indian painter and architect
Kurt Roesch (1905–1984), German/American painter
Claude Rogers (1907–1979), English painter and teacher 
Christian Rohlfs (1849–1938), German painter
Charles Roka (1912–1999), Hungarian/Norwegian painter
Fyodor Rokotov (1736–1809), Russian portrait painter
Charles Rollier (1912–1968), Swiss painter
Osvaldo Romberg (1938–2019), Argentine/Israeli artist and professor
Gillis Rombouts (1630–1678), Dutch painter
George Romney (1734–1802), English portrait painter
Martinus Rørbye (1803–1848), Danish painter
Guy Rose (1867–1925), American painter
Jan Henryk Rosen (1891–1982), Polish/American painter
James Rosenquist (1933–2017), American artist
Alexander Roslin (1718–1798), Swedish portrait painter
Toros Roslin (1210–1270), Armenian manuscript illuminator
Alex Ross (born 1970), American book artist and designer
Bob Ross (1942–1995), American painter and art instructor
Clifford Ross (born 1952), American painter, sculptor and photographer
Jacek Andrzej Rossakiewicz (born 1956), Polish painter, theorist and interior designer
Dante Gabriel Rossetti (1828–1882), English painter, illustrator and poet
Antonio Rotta (1928–1903), Italian painter
Jack Roth (1927–2004), American painter
Mark Rothko (1903–1970), American painter
Georges Rouault (1871–1958), French painter, draftsman and print artist
Henri Rousseau (1844–1910), French painter
Théodore Rousseau (1812–1867), French painter
Ker-Xavier Roussel (1867–1944), French painter
Thomas Rowlandson (1757–1827), English artist and caricaturist
Pierre Roy (1880–1950), French surrealist painter
György Rózsahegyi (1940–2010), Hungarian painter 
Peter Paul Rubens (1577–1640), Flemish artist and diplomat
Ernő Rubik (born 1944), Hungarian architect and inventor
Andrei Rublev (c. 1360 – 1430), Russian painter
Olaf Rude (1886–1957), Danish painter
Hermann Rüdisühli (1864–1944), Swiss painter
Andrée Ruellan (1905–2006), American painter
Jacob van Ruisdael (1628–1682), Dutch painter, draftsman and etcher
Alexander Runciman (1736–1785), Scottish painter
John Runciman (1744–1768/1769), Scottish painter
Phillip Otto Runge (1777–1810), German painter and draftsman
Edward Ruscha (born 1937), American painter, print-maker and photographer
Nadya Rusheva (1952–1969), Russian painter and illustrator
Santiago Rusiñol (1861–1931), Spanish painter, poet and playwright
Vlady Kibalchich Russakov (1920–2005), Russian/Mexican painter
Charles Marion Russell (1864–1926), American painter and sculptor
Morgan Russell (1886–1953), American artist
Jan Rustem (1762–1835), Polish (Armenian) painter
Ferdynand Ruszczyc (1870–1936), Polish painter, print-maker and stage designer
Rachel Ruysch (1664–1750), Dutch still-life painter
Salomon van Ruysdael (c. 1602 – 1670), Dutch painter
Andrei Ryabushkin (1861–1904), Russian painter
Anne Ryan (1889–1954), American print-maker and collagist
Eve Ryder (1896–1984), American painter
Ryūkōsai Jokei (流光斎如圭, fl. 1777–1809), Japanese woodblock print-maker, painter and illustrator

References
References can be found on the page of each entry.

R